This is a list of fictional baronets — characters who appear in fiction as a baronet of the United Kingdom, England, Ireland or Great Britain.

See also
 List of fictional nobility

References

Baronets